Shuru Rural District is a rural district (dehestan) in Kurin District, Zahedan County, Sistan and Baluchestan province, Iran. At the 2006 census, its population was 7,253, in 1,386 families. At the 2016 census, its population had risen to 8,134.

References 

Zahedan County
Rural Districts of Sistan and Baluchestan Province
Populated places in Zahedan County